Dorothy Boyle, Countess of Burlington and Countess of Cork (née Savile; 13 September 1699 – 21 September 1758) was a British noble and court official, as well as a caricaturist and portrait painter. Several of her studies and paintings were made of her daughters. Chatsworth House, which descended through her daughter Charlotte, holds a collection of 24 of her works of art.

Boyle had a great interest in the arts and was a patron of David Garrick and George Frideric Handel. She was one of Queen Caroline's Ladies of the Bedchamber. Savile Row, developed at the edge of the Boyle's Burlington House estate, was named after her (based on her surname, Savile).

Early life
Dorothy Boyle (née Savile) was born to William Savile, 2nd Marquess of Halifax and his second wife Mary Finch, whose father was Daniel Finch, 7th Earl of Winchilsea. Boyle was a co-heiress of her father's estate.

Boyle's two brothers both died when they were young. She had a sister, Mary, who wed Sackville, Earl of Thanet. Boyle also had a half-sister, Anne (married to the 3rd Earl of Ailesbury), from her father's first marriage to Elizabeth Grimston, daughter of Sir Samuel Grimston.

Artist

Boyle studied how to draw and paint portraits with pastels with William Kent and made copies of good portraits to develop her talent. Kent, who lived with Savile and Boyle for 30 years, studied painting in Rome and in addition to being an artist, he was a designer and landscape gardener.

Kent and Boyle made portraits of each other and George Vertue commented that Boyle's painting of Kent was "much more like than that done by Aikman". By the mid-1720s she had also studied with Joseph Goupy. During that time she advanced from pastels to oil painting. According to Neil Jeffares and the British Museum, she may have had lessons from Charles Jervas, the King's portrait painter.

Lady Boyle was a talented caricaturist and made good, though rapid, portraits. Horace Walpole said of Boyle, "She drew in crayons, and succeeded admirably in likenesses; but working with too much rapidity did not do justice to her genius. She had an uncommon talent too for caricatura."

Boyle made a portrait of daughter Dorothy from memory seven weeks after her daughter's death. Of the paintings at Chatsworth, the "new house" at Chiswick, 24 of the works were created by Boyle. Mrs. Selwyn, Lady Isabella Finch, and Lady Fitzwalter were among the friends to have received eight of Boyle's pastels that are now among the Chatsworth collection. The works in the collection include three oil paintings and pastel studies of her daughters and an oil painting of Princess Amelia. Her sketch, Woman at Harpsichord, with a Dog and a Cat, reveals an intimate scene where the woman plays a tune for her own pleasure.

She made a sketch of her friend Alexander Pope in his grotto and enjoyed making caricatures. He wrote five quatrains about her entitled On the Countess of B—— cutting paper.

Queen Caroline 
Boyle was one of Queen Caroline's Ladies of the Bedchamber. She was appointed to the post in 1727 at the same time as Mary, the Countess of Pembroke. On her appointment Lord Hervey said her manner was like 'a cringing House-Maid.'

Philanthropy
Boyle was one of the signatories to Thomas Coram's 1735 petition to King George II calling for the foundation of the Foundling Hospital. She signed the petition on 19 May on the same day as the Countess of Cardigan. The petition was initially unsuccessful, but Dorothy influenced her husband, Richard Boyle, 3rd Earl of Burlington, who in 1739 became involved in the creation of the Foundling Hospital and became a governor of the charity.

Alongside her husband, Richard Boyle, Boyle was a patron of the arts, taking a supporting interest in both David Garrick and George Frideric Handel. Garrick and Boyle were correspondents and a letter survives in the Folger Library collection from Garrick to Boyle from October 1750. Additionally the celebrated dancer Eva Marie Veigel (also known as Violette) lived with Boyle at her home Burlington House when she first came over to England in 1746. Garrick fell in love with the young dancer and in 1749 they wed. Boyle was initially against the match but was later persuaded to support the marriage.

Savile Row

Boyle drew up plans for a new street for townhouses. The Daily Post reported on 12 March 1733 that new buildings were about to be built on Savile Street in Mayfair, London. The Burlington Estate project was named after Lady Dorothy Boyle's maiden name, Savile. Savile Row was built by 1735 on freehold land known as Ten Acres belonging to a merchant tailor, William Maddox, By the late 18th century, it was a center for high-quality tailor shops.

Marriage and later life 

Dorothy Savile married Richard Boyle, 3rd Earl of Burlington on 21 March 1721 and brought a substantial dowry and a shared interest of theatre and music to the marriage. She enjoyed the opera, music, and theatre and was a patron of the arts, including David Garrick and George Frideric Handel. Her favorite writer was John Gay.

Soon after their marriage, Boyle began modernising Chiswick House and its grounds. They also lived at Londesborough, East Riding of Yorkshire and in London at Burlington House.

Boyle had three daughters: Dorothy (1724–1742), Julianna (1727–1730), and Charlotte (1731–1754). Jean-Baptiste van Loo painted a family portrait of Dorothy Boyle, her husband, and three daughters in 1739. The painting is currently located in Lismore Castle's Devonshire Collection.

In 1741, Boyle's eldest daughter, Dorothy, married the Earl of Euston, and died of smallpox just before her eighteenth birthday in 1742. Her husband "treated her with the utmost brutality, till her death." Her youngest daughter, Charlotte, married William, Marquess of Hartington, on 28 March 1748. Charlotte died of smallpox in 1754. She passed down her mother's artwork and correspondence to her descendants.

The Countess of Burlington died on 21 September 1758, aged 59.

Ancestry

Notes

References

Further reading

 
 

1699 births
1758 deaths
18th-century British women artists
English art patrons
Daughters of British marquesses
Dorothy
Savile family
Place of birth missing
Place of death missing
Ladies of the Bedchamber
English countesses
Cork
18th-century philanthropists
18th-century British artists
Court of George II of Great Britain
18th-century women philanthropists